Tiit Kändler (born on 4 October 1948 Turba, Harju County) is an Estonian humorist, publicist and science journalist.
	
From 1967 to 1972 he studied physics at University of Tartu.

He has been the editor for several publications, e.g. Maaleht, Vaatleja and Eesti Päevaleht.

References

Living people
1948 births
Estonian humorists
Estonian journalists
Estonian male writers
Estonian editors
20th-century Estonian writers
21st-century Estonian writers
Recipients of the Order of the White Star, 5th Class
University of Tartu alumni
People from Saue Parish